Beñat Txoperena Matxikote (born 18 July 1991 in Igantzi) is a Spanish former cyclist, who rode professionally between 2014 and 2018 for the  and  teams.

Major results

2013
 2nd Road race, National Under-23 Road Championships
2014
 8th Overall Tour des Pays de Savoie
2015
 7th Overall GP Internacional do Guadiana
2017
 3rd Overall Volta Internacional Cova da Beira

References

External links

1991 births
Living people
Spanish male cyclists
Cyclists from Navarre
People from Cinco Villas, Navarre